Soledad González Pomes de Huguet (born 24 September 1934) is an Argentine chess player who holds the FIDE title of Woman International Master (WIM, 1957). She was a two-time winner of the Argentine Women's Chess Championship (1954, 1956).

Biography
From the late 1950s to the early 1960s Soledad Gonzalez de Huguet was one of the leading Argentine women's chess players. She twice won Argentine Women's Chess Championships: 1954 and 1956. In 1957, in Rio de Janeiro Soledad Gonzalez de Huguet won Women's World Chess Championship South America Zonal Tournament and awarded the FIDE Woman International Master (WIM) title. In 1959, she participated in the Women's World Chess Championship Candidates Tournament in Plovdiv and ranked 15th place. In 1963, in Fortaleza Soledad Gonzalez de Huguet ranked 3rd in Women's World Chess Championship South America Zonal Tournament.

References

External links

1934 births
Possibly living people
Argentine female chess players
Chess Woman International Masters